Turn the Tide on Plastic is a Volvo Ocean 65 yacht. As Team Vestas Wind, she finished seventh in the 2014–15 Volvo Ocean Race skippered by Chris Nicholson.

Following the race, the boat was refitted for the 2017–18 Volvo Ocean Race and renamed.

2017-2018 Volvo Ocean Race 
The crew was:
Dee Caffari (skipper)
Nico Lunven
Martin Strömberg
Liz Wardley
Annalise Murphy
Francesca Clapcich
Bianca Cook
Lucas Chapman
Bleddyn Mon
Bernardo Freitas
Henry Bomby
Frederico Melo
Elodie Mettraux

2014-2015 Volvo Ocean Race 

As Team Vestas Wind, this was the 7th boat to announce it is participation to the race on September 1, 2014, following a press release from Alicante, Spain.

The yacht finished last overall as she only completed 3 of the 9 legs in the race due to the grounding incident.

The crew was:

Crew
 Chris Nicholson, Australia. Skipper. 5th Volvo Ocean Race.
 Nicolai Sehested, Denmark. Boat captain.
 Peter Wibroe, Denmark.
 Tony Rae, New Zealand. 5th Volvo Ocean Race
Simeon Tienpont,  Netherlands, crew member.
Tom Addis, Australia, Navigator.
 Robert Salthouse, New Zealand, 4th Volvo Ocean Race
 Tom Johnson, Australia, number 1, Coxswain.
 Wouter Verbraak, Netherlands. Navigation. 3rd Volvo Ocean Race
 Maciel Cicchetti, Argentina. Coxswain. 2nd Volvo Ocean Race.
 Brian Carlin, Ireland. Reporter.

Grounding

On November 30, 2014, during a night navigation, the yacht grounded on a coral atoll of St. Brandon. This happened 10 days after leaving Cape Town, on the way to Abu Dhabi. The yacht was damaged and repaired the race for the last 2 legs. The grounding was because the atoll was not visible on the low scale chart. The crew was rescued by the Mauritius coast guard the next morning. The cause of the grounding was a combination of human error and the features of the navigation software. The software did not show the atoll on the route planning display at low or medium zoom levels, while the atoll would have been shown in the navigation chart display at those zoom levels. The crew on watch did not notice there was a wrong chart display on.

After the grounding the yacht was salvaged and repaired and managed to compete in the final legs 8 and 9 with a new navigator crew.

References

Volvo Ocean Race yachts
Volvo Ocean 65 yachts
Sailing yachts of Denmark
2010s sailing yachts
Sailing yachts designed by Farr Yacht Design